Florian Kreuzwirth (born 11 July 1987) is an Austrian football goalkeeper.

References

1987 births
Living people
Austrian footballers
SC Schwanenstadt players
1. FC Vöcklabruck players
SV Grödig players
TSV St. Johann im Pongau players
2. Liga (Austria) players
Association football goalkeepers